Edwin Charles Tubb (15 October 1919 – 10 September 2010) was a British writer of science fiction, fantasy and western novels. The author of over 140 novels and 230 short stories and novellas, Tubb is best known for The Dumarest Saga (US collective title: Dumarest of Terra), an epic science-fiction saga set in the far future. Michael Moorcock wrote, "His reputation for fast-moving and colourful SF writing is unmatched by anyone in Britain."

Much of Tubb's work was written under pseudonyms including Gregory Kern, Carl Maddox, Alan Guthrie, Eric Storm and George Holt. He used 58 pen names over five decades of writing, although some of these were publishers' house names also used by other writers: Volsted Gridban (along with John Russell Fearn), Gill Hunt (with John Brunner and Dennis Hughes), King Lang (with George Hay and John W Jennison), Roy Sheldon (with H. J. Campbell) and Brian Shaw. Tubb's Charles Grey alias was solely his own and acquired a big following in the early 1950s.

Life
Tubb was born in London and resided there until his death in 2010. He married Iris Kathleen Smith in 1944 and is survived by their two daughters, Jennifer and Linda, three grandsons, John Barham, Alan Barham and Steven, and two granddaughters, Lisa Elcomb and Julie Hickmott.

Career
An avid reader of pulp science-fiction and fantasy in his youth, in 1938 Tubb made contact with other British fans and made his first attempts at writing in the genre. "My first attempts were written for my own pleasure," he later told New Worlds, "and they are now perfect examples of what not to do". Tubb found that he had a particular talent as a writer of stories in that genre when his short story "No Short Cuts" was published in New Worlds magazine in 1951. Previously a salesman of printing machinery, he opted for a full-time career as a writer and soon became renowned for the speed and diversity of his output.

Tubb contributed to many of the science fiction magazines of the 1950s including Futuristic Science Stories, Science Fantasy, Nebula. and Galaxy Science Fiction. He contributed heavily to Authentic Science Fiction, editing the magazine for nearly two years from February 1956 until it folded in October 1957. During this time he found it so difficult to find good writers to contribute to the magazine that he often wrote most of the stories himself under a variety of pseudonyms: one issue of Authentic was written entirely by Tubb, including the letters column.

His main work in the science fiction genre, the Dumarest series, appeared from 1967 to 1985, with two final volumes in 1997 and 2008. His second major series, the Cap Kennedy series, was written from 1973 to 1983.

Later in life Tubb updated many of his 1950s science fiction novels for 21st century readers.

Tubb was one of the co-founders of the British Science Fiction Association.

Honors
Tubb was Guest of Honour at Heicon, the 1970 World Science Fiction Convention, in Heidelberg, Germany. He was a five-time winner of the Nebula Science Fiction Magazine Literary Award (1953–1958) and the recipient of the 1955 Cytricon Literary Award for Best British SF Writer. His short story "Lucifer!" won the Europa Prize in 1972. In 2010, his novel The Possessed (2005, revised version of Touch of Evil [1959]) won the Premio Italia Award for Best International Novel.

Works

The Dumarest saga
Tubb's best known series is The Dumarest Saga (US collective title: Dumarest of Terra), a far future epic science-fiction saga charting the adventures of traveler Earl Dumarest as he attempts to find his way back to his home planet, Earth, from a region of space so far distant that the existence of the planet is believed to be nothing more than a myth. Originally written in what Michael Moorcock has described as a "conscious and acknowledged imitation" of Leigh Brackett's Eric John Stark stories, the series subsequently developed a style of storytelling unique to Tubb.

Published over a span of more than 40 years, the Dumarest Saga comprised 33 novels. The 33rd, which brings closure to Dumarest's search for Earth, was published in 2008 by Homeworld Press of Chicago. A pair of Dumarest short stories, entitled "Child of Earth" and "Figona" and published in the science fiction anthologies Fantasy Adventures 1 (2002) and Fantasy Adventures 2 (2003), were extracts from this longer work.

Cap Kennedy series
Tubb's other main novel series, Cap Kennedy, is space opera in the style of Perry Rhodan. Known as F.A.T.E. in the UK (where only the first six books have ever been published), the novels follow the adventures of Captain 'Cap' Kennedy, a Free Acting Terran Envoy (F.A.T.E.) with licence to act as judge, jury, and executioner, and the power to intervene in any situation which threatens the peace of the Terran Sphere, an interplanetary federation centred on Earth.

Independently wealthy and operating from his personal spaceship, the Mordain, Kennedy is assisted on his missions by engineer Penza Saratov, veteran scientist Professor Jarl Luden, and alien navigator Veem Chemile, a humanoid chameleon who claims to be descended from the Zheltyana, an ancient race which dominated the galaxy in the distant past before vanishing without trace. The discovery of mysterious artifacts left behind by the Zheltyana on different worlds often provided the spring-board for the stories in the series.

Lester del Rey found that although the first volume managed to "avoid the primitiveness and the formula" that spoiled many similar series, the virtues of such series were also missing, leaving him unenthusiastic. He later noted improvement in a subsequent installment.

Tubb wrote 17 Cap Kennedy novels, all under the pseudonym Gregory Kern.

These books were the basis for the Commander Scott series from German publishers Bastei. This series included all of the Cap Kennedy books by Tubb as well as a number of further novels, written under pseudonym by different German authors. Published in the format of romanheft (a digest-sized version of pulp magazines), the series lasted for 42 issues from 1975 to 1976. (See the entry under the German Wikipedia, Commander Scott.)

Space: 1999 series
Tubb was the author of six novels based on Gerry Anderson's 1975 science fiction television series Space: 1999. Breakaway (1975), Collision Course (1975) and Earthbound (2003) are novelizations of 11 scripts written for the series' first season format (including two that were subsequently filmed as second-season episodes), while Alien Seed (1976), Rogue Planet (1976) and Earthfall (1977, revised 2002) are original novels set within the first season continuity. The latter rejected the format changes of the TV series' second season to provide a satisfactory conclusion to the Space 1999 story.

Tubb's short story "Random Sample" from New Writings in SF 29 (1976) was revised to become "Dead End", a short story in the Space: 1999 anthology Shepherd Moon (2010). The original story's Prometheus starship crew are replaced by the Moonbase Alpha characters in the Space: 1999 version. "Random Sample" was itself a revised version of a much earlier Tubb short, "Entrance Exam", originally published in New Worlds magazine (1951).

Other science fiction
Tubb's best known standalone novel is The Space-Born (1956), which started life as a serial for New Worlds Science Fiction magazine entitled "Star Ship". An acknowledged masterpiece of the "generational starship" story, the book tells of a society who are the sixteenth generation of the original crew of a vast starship on a 300-year journey to Pollux from Earth. The plot centres on a protagonist whose job is to eliminate anyone who has become a burden to the society, through ill health, mental instability, or anyone over 40.

Other notable standalone novels include Alien Dust (1955), which charts the first 35 years of an Earth colony on Mars, and Moon Base (1964), a science fiction detective thriller set on a British Moonbase where a biochemical computer is under development. The short story collections Ten From Tomorrow (1966), A Scatter of Stardust (1972) and The Best Science Fiction of E.C. Tubb (2003) contain the best of Tubb's short form writing, including "The Last Day of Summer" (1955), "Little Girl Lost" (1955), "Vigil" (1956), "The Bells of Acheron" (1957), "Fresh Guy" (1958), "The Ming Vase" (1963), "J is for Jeanne" (1965), and "Evane" (1973).

Other genres
Outside the field of science fiction, Tubb wrote 11 western novels, a detective novel and a Foreign Legion novel for Badger Books. Once again, many of these were published under a variety of pseudonyms, including the house name "Chuck Adams", which were also used by other authors. In the 1970s he wrote a trilogy of historical novels set in Ancient Rome under the pseudonym Edward Thomson.

Dramatisations
Tubb's 1955 novel The Space-Born was dramatised for French television in 1962 as a 90-minute play for Radiodiffusion-Télévision Française. The production was directed by Alain Boudet from a script by Michael Subrela and broadcast on 11 December 1962.

The short story "Little Girl Lost", originally published in New Worlds magazine (1955), was dramatised as a segment of Night Gallery in 1972. Adapted by Stanford Whitmore and directed by Timothy Galfras, with a cast featuring William Windom and Ed Nelson, the segment originally aired on 1 March 1972, paired with The Caterpillar in the penultimate episode of the series' second season.

Tubb's award-winning short story "Lucifer!" (later published in a slightly revised version under the title "Fallen Angel") was adapted for the 2022 film, "57 Seconds" starring Morgan Freeman and Josh Hutcherson. The title "57 Seconds" refers to the amount of time that the ring possessed by the main character sets back time.

Bibliography

The Dumarest Saga (US: Dumarest of Terra) 
 The Winds of Gath (1967) (also published with slightly modified text as Gath [1968, 2010])
 Derai (1968) (also published as The Death Zone [2010])
 Toyman (1969)
 Kalin (1969)
 The Jester at Scar (1970)
 Lallia (1971)
 Technos (1972)
 Veruchia (1973)
 Mayenne (1973)
 Jondelle (1973)
 Zenya (1974)
 Eloise (1975)
 Eye of the Zodiac (1975)
 Jack of Swords (1976)
 Spectrum of a Forgotten Sun (1976)
 Haven of Darkness (1977)
 Prison of Night (1977)
 Incident on Ath (1978)
 The Quillian Sector (1978)
 Web of Sand (1979)
 Iduna's Universe (1979)
 The Terra Data (1980)
 World of Promise (1980)
 Nectar of Heaven (1981)
 The Terridae (1981)
 The Coming Event (1982)
 Earth is Heaven (1982)
 Melome (1983) (published in UK with Angado [1984] as Melome and Angado  [1988])
 Angado (1984) (published in UK with Melome [1983] as Melome and Angado  [1988])
 Symbol of Terra (1984) (published in UK with The Temple of Truth [1985] as Symbol of Terra and The Temple of Truth [1989])
 The Temple of Truth (1985) (published in UK with Symbol of Terra [1985] as Symbol of Terra and The Temple of Truth [1989])
 The Return (1997) (written 1985 but previously only published in French language as Le Retour [1992])
 Child of Earth (2008)
 The Winds of Gath / Derai (1973) (omnibus edition of The Winds of Gath [1967] and Derai [1968])
 Mayenne and Jondelle (1981) (omnibus edition of Mayenne [1973] and Jondelle [1973])
 Dumarest of Terra Omnibus (2005) (omnibus edition of The Winds of Gath [1967], Derai [1968], Toyman [1969] and Kalin [1969])

Cap Kennedy (UK: F.A.T.E.) 
All as by Gregory Kern

 Galaxy of the Lost (1973)
 Slave Ship from Sergan (1973)
 Monster of Metelaze (1973)
 Enemy Within the Skull (1974)
 Jewel of Jarhen (1974)
 Seetee Alert! (1974)
 The Gholan Gate (1974)
 The Eater of Worlds (1974)
 Earth Enslaved (1974
 Planet of Dread (1974)
 Spawn of Laban (1974)
 The Genetic Buccaneer (1974)
 A World Aflame (1974)
 The Ghosts of Epidoris (1975)
 Mimics of Dephene (1975)
 Beyond the Galactic Lens (1975)
 The Galactiad (1983) (written 1976 but previously only published in German language as Das kosmische Duell [1976])

Space: 1999 
 Breakaway (1975)
 Collision Course (1975)
 Alien Seed (1976)
 Rogue Planet (1976)
 Earthfall (1977) (also published in 25th anniversary revised edition [2002])
 Earthbound (2003)

The Chronicles of Malkar 
 Death God's Doom (1999)
 The Sleeping City (1999)

Other science fiction novels 

 Saturn Patrol (1951), as by King Lang
 also published as Saturn Patrol (1996) by E.C. Tubb
 Planetfall (1951), as by Gill Hunt
 Argentis (1952), as by Brian Shaw
 also published as Argentis (1979) by E.C. Tubb
 Alien Impact (1952)
 Alien Universe (1952), as by Volsted Gridban
 also published as The Green Helix (2009) by E.C. Tubb
 Reverse Universe (1952), as by Volsted Gridban
 Atom War on Mars (1952)
 Planetoid Disposals Ltd. (1953), as by Volsted Gridban
 De Bracy's Drug (1953), as by Volsted Gridban
 also published as De Bracy's Drug (2004) by E.C. Tubb
 also published as The Freedom Army (2009) by E.C. Tubb
 Fugitive of Time (1953), as by Volsted Gridban
 The Wall (1953), as by Charles Grey
 also published as The Wall (1999, 2009) by E.C. Tubb
 The Mutants Rebel (1953)
 also published as World in Torment (2008)
 Dynasty of Doom (1953), as by Charles Grey
 The Tormented City (1953), as by Charles Grey
 also published as Secret of the Towers (2008) by E.C. Tubb
 Space Hunger (1953), as by Charles Grey
 also published as Earth Set Free (1999) by E.C. Tubb
 also published as The Price of Freedom (2008) by E.C. Tubb
 I Fight for Mars (1953), as by Charles Grey
 also published as I Fight for Mars (1998) by E.C. Tubb
 Venusian Adventure (1953)
 Alien Life (1954)
 The Living World (1954), as by Carl Maddox
 The Extra Man (1954)
 also published as Fifty Days to Doom (2010)
 Menace from the Past (1954), as by Carl Maddox
 The Metal Eater (1954), as by Roy Sheldon
 Journey to Mars (1954)
 World at Bay (1954)
 also published as Tide of Death (2008)
 City of No Return (1954)
 Hell Planet (1954)
 The Resurrected Man (1954)
 The Stellar Legion (1954)
 The Hand of Havoc (1954), as by Charles Grey
 Enterprise 2115 (1954), as by Charles Grey
 also published as The Mechanical Monarch (1958) by E.C. Tubb
 Alien Dust (1955)
 The Space-Born (1956)
 Touch of Evil (1957), as by Arthur Maclean
 also published in revised version as The Possessed (2005) by E.C. Tubb
 Moon Base (1964)
 Death is a Dream (1967)
 The Life-Buyer (1967)
 also published as The Life Buyer (2006)
 C.O.D. - Mars (1968)
 also published as Fear of Strangers (2007)
 Escape into Space (1969)
 S.T.A.R. Flight (1969)
 Century of the Manikin (1972)
 The Primitive (1977)
 Death Wears a White Face (1979)
 also published as Dead Weight (2007)
 Stellar Assignment (1979)
 The Luck Machine (1980)
 Pawn of the Omphalos (1980)
 also published in revised version as Death God's Doom (1999)
 Stardeath (1983)
 Pandora's Box (1996) (previously unpublished work written 1954)
 Temple of Death (1996) (previously unpublished work written 1954)
 Alien Life (1998) (revised and expanded version of Alien Life [1954])
 also published as Journey into Terror (2009)
 Alien Worlds (1999) (collection of Alien Dust [1955] and Alien Universe [1952])
 Footsteps of Angels (2004) (previously unpublished work written c.1988)
 Starslave (2010) (previously unpublished work written 1984)
 To Dream Again (2011)
 Fires of Satan (2012)

Short story collections 
 Supernatural Stories 9 (1957), as by various pseudonyms
 Ten from Tomorrow (1966)
 A Scatter of Stardust (1972)
 Kalgan the Golden (1996)
 Murder in Space (1997)
 The Best Science Fiction of E.C. Tubb (2003)
 Mirror of the Night and Other Weird Tales (2003)
 The Wager: Science Fiction Mystery Tales (2011)
 The Ming Vase and Other Science Fiction Stories (2011) 
 Enemy of the State: Fantastic Mystery Stories (2011) 
 Tomorrow: Science Fiction Mystery Tales (2011) 
 The Wonderful Day: Science Fiction Stories (2012) 
 Only One Winner: Science Fiction Mystery Tales (2013)

Novellas 
 Freight (1953, Nebula 3)
 Subtle Victory (1953, Authentic Science Fiction 39)
 The Inevitable Conflict (1954, Vargo Statten Science Fiction 1–3)
 Forbidden Fruit (1954, Vargo Statten/British Science Fiction 4–6)
 Star Haven (1954, Authentic Science Fiction 52)
 Number Thirteen (1956, Authentic Science Fiction 69), as by Douglas West
 The Big Secret (1956, Authentic Science Fiction 70), as by Ken Wainwright
 The Give-Away Worlds (1956, Authentic Science Fiction 72), as by Julian Cary
 Enemy of the State (1956, Authentic Science Fiction 74), as by Ken Wainwright
 There's Only One Winner (1957, Authentic Science Fiction 81), as by Nigel Lloyd
 The Touch of Reality (1958, Nebula 28)
 Galactic Destiny (1959, SF Adventures 10)
 Spawn of Jupiter (1970, Vision of Tomorrow 11)

Non-SF novels 
 Assignment New York (1955), as by Mike Lantry
 also published as Assignment New York (1996) by E.C. Tubb
 The Fighting Fury (1955), as by Paul Schofield
 also published as The Fighting Fury (1962), as by Chuck Adams
 also published as The Gold Seekers (2000) by E.C. Tubb
 Comanche Capture (1955), as by E. F. Jackson
 also published as The Captive (2000), as by E.F. Jackson
 also published as The Captive (2010) by E.C. Tubb
 Sands of Destiny (1955), as by Jud Cary
 also published as Sands of Destiny (2009) by E.C. Tubb
 also published as Sands of Destiny: A Novel of the French Foreign Legion (2011) by E.C. Tubb
 Men of the Long Rifle (1955), as by J.F. Clarkson
 also published as The Pathfinders (2000), as by Charles Grey
 Scourge of the South (1956), as by M.L. Powers
 also published as The Marauders (1960), as by M.L. Powers
 also published as Scourge of the South (2000), as by George Holt
 Vengeance Trail (1956), as by James Farrow
 also published as The Liberators (2000), as by Brett Landry
 Trail Blazers (1956), as by Chuck Adams
 also published as The Last Outlaw (1961), as by Chuck Adams
 also published as Trail Blazers (2000), as by Eric Storm
 also published as Trail Blazers (2007) by E.C. Tubb
 Quest for Quantrell (1956), as by John Stevens
 also published as Night Raiders (1960), as by John Stevens
 also published as Curse of Quantrill (2000), as by Carl Maddox
 Drums of the Prairie (1956), as by P. Lawrence
 also published as The Red Lance (1959), as by L.P. Eastern
 also published as The Dying Tree (2000), as by Edward Thomson
 Men of the West (1956), as by Chet Lawson
 also published as Massacre Trail (1960), as by Chuck Adams
 also published as Hills of Blood (2000), as by Frank Weight
 Wagon Trail (1957), as by Charles S. Graham
 also published as Cauldron of Violence (2000), as by Gordon Kent
 also published as Cauldron of Violence (2010) by E.C. Tubb
 Colt Vengeance (1957), as by James R. Fenner
 also published as Colt Law (1962), as by Chuck Adams
 also published as The First Shot (2000) by E.C. Tubb

The Gladiators 
All as by Edward Thomson

 Atilus the Slave (1975)
 Atilus the Gladiator (1975)
 Gladiator (1978)

Comic Books 
 Hellfire Landing (Commando  issue 5, 1961)
 Target Death (Combat Library  issue 102, 1961)
 Lucky Strike (War Picture Library  issue 124, 1961)
 Calculated Risk (Air Ace Picture Library  issue 78, 1961)
 Too Tough to Handle (War Picture Library  issue 134, 1962)
 The Dead Keep Faith (War Picture Library  issue 140, 1962)
 The Spark of Anger (Battle Picture Library  issue 52, 1962)
 Full Impact (Air Ace Picture Library  issue 92, 1962)
 I Vow Vengeance (War at Sea Picture Library  issue 7, 1962)
 One Must Die (Battle Picture Library  issue 72, 1962)
 Gunflash (War Picture Library  issue 157, 1962)
 Hit Back (Battle Picture Library  issue 69, 1962)
 Suicide Squad (War Picture Library  issue 172, 1962)
 No Higher Stakes (Battle Picture Library  issue 89, 1963)
 Penalty of Fear (Thriller Picture Library  issue 444, 1963)

Anthologies 
 Gateway to the Stars (ed. John Carnell, 1955) - 'Unfortunate Purchase'
 SF: The Year's Greatest Science Fiction and Fantasy (ed. Judith Merril, 1956) - 'The Last Day of Summer'
 SF '59: The Year's Greatest Science Fiction and Fantasy (ed. Judith Merril, 1959) - 'Fresh Guy'
 The Vampire (ed. Ornella Volta and Valerio Riva, 1963) - 'Fresh Guy'
 The Year's Best SF: 9 (ed. Judith Merril, 1964) - 'The Ming Vase'
 Dimension 4 (ed. Groff Conklin, 1964) - 'Sense of Proportion'
 Best of New Worlds (ed. Michael Moorcock, 1965) - 'New Experience'
 Weird Shadows from Beyond (ed. John Carnell, 1965) - 'Fresh Guy'
 New Writings in SF 6 (ed. John Carnell, 1965) - 'The Seekers'
 The Year's Best SF: 11th (ed. Judith Merril, 1966) - 'J is for Jeanne'
 SF Reprise 1 (ed. Michael Moorcock, 1966) - 'New Experience'
 Window on the Future (ed. Douglas Hill, 1966) - 'Sense of Proportion'
 9th Annual S-F (ed. Judith Merril, 1967) - 'The Ming Vase'
 The Devil His Due (ed. Douglas Hill, 1967) - 'Return Visit'
 More Tales of Unease (ed. John Burke, 1969) - 'Little Girl Lost'
 The Best of Sci-fi 12 (ed. Judith Merril, 1970) - 'J is for Jeanne'
 The Year's Best Horror Stories (ed. Richard Davis, 1971) - 'Lucifer!'
 New Writings in Horror and the Supernatural (ed. David Sutton, 1971) - 'The Winner'
 New Writings in SF 22 (ed. Kenneth Bulmer, 1973) - 'Evane'
 Space 1 (ed. Richard Davis, 1973) - 'Mistaken Identity'
 The 1974 Annual World's Best SF (ed. Donald Wollheim, 1974) - 'Evane'
 New Writings in SF 23 (ed. Kenneth Bulmer,1974) - 'Made to be Broken', 'Accolade'
 History of the Science Fiction Magazine 1946-1955 (ed. Mike Ashley, 1974) - 'The Wager'
 World's Best SF Short Stories 1 (ed. Donald Wollheim, 1975) - 'Evane'
 New Writings in SF 28 (ed. Kenneth Bulmer, 1976) - 'Face to Infinity'
 New Writings in SF 29 (ed. Kenneth Bulmer, 1976) - 'Random Sample'
 Best of British SF Vol. 2 (ed. Mike Ashley, 1977) - 'Trojan Horse'
 Strange Planets (ed. A. Williams-Ellis and M. Pearson, 1977) - 'Made to be Broken'
 New Writings in SF 30 (ed. Kenneth Bulmer, 1978) - 'Read Me This Riddle'
 Perilous Planets (ed. Brian Aldiss, 1978) - 'The Seekers'
 The Androids Are Coming (ed. Robert Silverberg, 1979) - 'The Captain's Dog'
 Wollheim's World of Best SF (ed. Donald Wollheim, 1979) - 'Evane'
 Heroic Fantasy (ed. Gerald Page and Hank Reinhardt, 1979) - 'Blood in the Mist'
 Pulsar 2 (ed. George Hay, 1979) - 'The Knife'
 Jewels of Wonder (ed. Mike Ashley, 1981) - 'Blood in the Mist'
 The Drabble Project (ed. Rob Meades and David B Wake, 1988) - 'As it Really Was', 'The Very Small Knife'
 Space Stories (ed. Mike Ashley, 1996) - 'The Bells of Acheron'
 Classical Stories: Heroic Tales from Ancient Greece and Rome (ed. Mike Ashley, 1996) - 'The Sword of Freedom'
 The New Random House Book of Science Fiction Stories (ed. Mike Ashley, 1997) - 'The Bells of Acheron'
 Fantasy Annual 1 (ed. Philip Harbottle and Sean Wallace, 1997) - 'Time and Again'
 Heroic Adventure Stories: From the Golden Age of Greece and Rome (ed. Mike Ashley, 1998) - 'The Sword of Freedom'
 Giant Book of Heroic Adventure Stories (ed. Mike Ashley, 1998) - 'The Sword of Freedom'
 The Iron God/Tomorrow Gryphon Double (ed. Philip Harbottle, 1998) - 'Tomorrow'
 Fantasy Annual 2 (ed. Philip Harbottle and Sean Wallace, 1998) - 'Gift Wrapped'
 Fantasy Annual 3 (ed. Philip Harbottle and Sean Wallace, 1999) - 'Fallen Angel'
 Gryphon Science Fiction and Fantasy Reader 1 (ed. Philip Harbottle, 1999) - 'Talk Not at All'
 Fantasy Annual 4 (ed. Philip Harbottle and Sean Wallace, 2000) - 'Afternoon'
 Fantasy Quarterly 1 (ed. Philip Harbottle, 2001) - 'The Inevitable Conflict'
 Fantasy Adventures 1 (ed. Philip Harbottle, 2002) - 'Child of Earth'
 Fantasy Adventures 2 (ed. Philip Harbottle, 2002) - 'Figona', 'Emergency Exit'
 Fantasy Annual 5 (ed. Philip Harbottle and Sean Wallace, 2003) - 'Lazarus'
 Fantasy Adventures 3 (ed. Philip Harbottle, 2003) - 'Illusion'
 Fantasy Adventures 4 (ed. Philip Harbottle, 2003) - 'The Greater Ideal'
 Fantasy Adventures 5 (ed. Philip Harbottle, 2003) - 'The Answer'
 Fantasy Adventures 6 (ed. Philip Harbottle, 2003) - 'Food for Friendship'
 Fantasy Adventures 7 (ed. Philip Harbottle, 2003) - 'Sell Me a Dream'
 Mammoth Book of New Terror (ed. Stephen Jones, 2004) - 'Mirror of the Night'
 Fantasy Adventures 8 (ed. Philip Harbottle, 2004) - 'Jackpot'
 Fantasy Adventures 9 (ed. Philip Harbottle, 2004) - 'Spawn of Jupiter'
 Fantasy Adventures 10 (ed. Philip Harbottle, 2004) - 'The Dilettantes'
 Fantasy Adventures 11 (ed. Philip Harbottle, 2004) - 'Agent'
 Fantasy Adventures 12 (ed. Philip Harbottle, 2006) - 'You Go'
 Space:1999 - Shepherd Moon (ed. Mateo Latosa, 2010) - 'Dead End'

Notes

External links 
 
 E. C. Tubb at The Encyclopedia of Science Fiction, 3rd edition 
 The E. C. Tubb Homepage at Internet Archive (archived 12 March 2008)
 E.C. Tubb Fansite (ectubb.org.uk) at Internet Archive (archived 25 October 2011)
 Tubb works at FantasticFiction.co.uk
 

  (and others under as many as 17 pseudonyms)

1919 births
2010 deaths
English science fiction writers
British comics writers
20th-century British novelists
English male novelists